Bình Thuận station (Ga Bình Thuận) is one of the main railway stations on the North–South railway in Vietnam. It serves the city of Phan Thiết. Phan Thiết has its own railway station (Phan Thiet station), but it is not located on the main North–South Railway. The old name of this station is Mương Mán station. Some Reunification Express trains stop only at Mương Mán.

References

Railway stations in Vietnam
Buildings and structures in Bình Thuận province